Coronephthya is a monotypic genus of corals belonging to the family Nephtheidae. The only species is Coronephthya macrospiculata.

The species is found in near Eastern Australia.

References

Nephtheidae
Octocorallia genera
Monotypic cnidarian genera